The Roswell incident centers on the recovery, in 1947, of metallic and rubber debris from a military balloon that crashed near Roswell, New Mexico.  Decades later, conspiracy theories claimed that the debris was from a flying saucer which had been covered up by the United States government.  In 1994, the United States Air Force published a report identifying the crashed object as a nuclear test surveillance balloon from Project Mogul.

On July 8, 1947, Roswell Army Air Field issued a press release stating that they had recovered a "flying disc". The Army quickly retracted the statement and said instead that the crashed object was a conventional weather balloon. The Roswell incident was not widely discussed until the late 1970s, when retired lieutenant colonel Jesse Marcel, in an interview with ufologist Stanton Friedman, said he believed the debris he retrieved was extraterrestrial. Ufologists began promoting a variety of increasingly elaborate conspiracy theories, claiming that one or more alien spacecraft had crash-landed and that the extraterrestrial occupants had been recovered by the military, which then engaged in a cover-up. 

Conspiracy theories about the event persist, and the Roswell incident continues to be of interest in popular media. The incident has been described as "the world's most famous, most exhaustively investigated, and most thoroughly debunked UFO claim".  The city of Roswell, New Mexico has capitalized on the event; the city's official seal now features a little green man while the city contains countless ufology attractions, events, statues and iconography.

Events of July 1947

The Roswell incident occurred amid the flying saucer craze of 1947. On June 26, media nationwide had reported civilian pilot Kenneth Arnold's story of seeing what became known as "Flying Saucers". Historians would later chronicle over 800 "copycat" sightings that were reported after the Arnold story was published.  On July 4, United Airlines Flight 105 reported seeing multiple 'flying discs'.  

In June 1947, rancher W.W. "Mac" Brazel found debris – tinfoil, rubber, and thin wooden beams – scattered across a square mile near Corona, New Mexico.  Brazel gathered it and pushed it under some brush to dispose of it. The ranch had no phone and no radio, leaving Brazel unaware of the on-going flying saucer craze.  On Saturday night, July 5, Brazel drove into Corona, where he heard stories of silvery flying discs. On July 7, Brazel transported some of the debris to the sheriff's office in Roswell; The sheriff called Roswell Army Air Field, which assigned the matter to Major Jesse Marcel. Brazel took Marcel back to the debris site, and the two gathered up more pieces of rubber and tinfoil. Marcel took the material home on Monday night.

On Tuesday morning, July 8, Marcel took the material to his base commander, Colonel William Blanchard. Blanchard reported the finding to General Roger Ramey at Fort Worth Army Air Field (FWAAF). General Ramey ordered the material flown to FWAAF immediately. Marcel boarded a B-29 Superfortress and made the flight to FWAAF.

On July 8, 1947, RAAF public information officer Walter Haut issued a press release stating that personnel from the field's 509th Operations Group had recovered a "flying disc", which had landed on a ranch near Roswell.

The many rumors regarding the flying disc became a reality yesterday when the intelligence office of the 509th Bomb group of the Eighth Air Force, Roswell Army Air Field, was fortunate enough to gain possession of a disc through the cooperation of one of the local ranchers and the sheriff's office of Chaves County. The flying object landed on a ranch near Roswell sometime last week. Not having phone facilities, the rancher stored the disc until such time as he was able to contact the sheriff's office, who in turn notified Maj. Jesse A. Marcel of the 509th Bomb Group Intelligence Office.
 Action was immediately taken and the disc was picked up at the rancher's home. It was inspected at the Roswell Army Air Field and subsequently loaned by Major Marcel to higher headquarters.

Decades later, Roswell radio announcer Frank Joyce recalled contacting Haut by telephone to verify the release. Recalled Joyce: "I said 'Walter, don't run this story. If you do, you're going to be in trouble. They'll ship you out to Siberia." I remember mentioning that, that was a common phrase in those days".

As soon as Marcel brought the material to General Ramey's office, both Ramey and his chief of staff Colonel Thomas Dubose identified the material as pieces of a weather balloon kite. The FWAAF weather officer on duty explained to reporters that such "ray wind" devices were used at about 80 weather stations across the country. The balloons were attached to a six-pointed reflective device that looked like a silver star. After launch, the balloon expanded with increasing altitude before bursting around 60,000 feet with pieces then dispersing in their fall to the ground.

As described in the July 9, 1947, edition of the Roswell Daily Record:
The balloon which held it up, if that was how it worked, must have been 12 feet [3.5 m] long, [Brazel] felt, measuring the distance by the size of the room in which he sat. The rubber was smoky gray in color and scattered over an area about 200 yards [180 m] in diameter. When the debris was gathered up, the tinfoil, paper, tape, and sticks made a bundle about three feet [1 m] long and 7 or 8 inches [18 or 20 cm] thick, while the rubber made a bundle about 18 or 20 inches [45 or 50 cm] long and about 8 inches [20 cm] thick. In all, he estimated, the entire lot would have weighed maybe five pounds [2 kg]. There was no sign of any metal in the area which might have been used for an engine, and no sign of any propellers of any kind, although at least one paper fin had been glued onto some of the tinfoil. There were no words to be found anywhere on the instrument, although there were letters on some of the parts. Considerable Scotch tape and some tape with flowers printed upon it had been used in the construction. No strings or wires were to be found but there were some eyelets in the paper to indicate that some sort of attachment may have been used.

On July 9, Brazel told the Roswell Daily Record that the debris consisted of "large area of bright wreckage made up of rubber strips, tinfoil, a rather tough paper and sticks." He paid little attention to it but returned later with his wife and daughter to gather up some of the debris.

On July 9, Marcel explained: "[We] spent a couple of hours Monday afternoon [July 7] looking for any more parts of the weather device", said Marcel. "We found a few more patches of tinfoil and rubber." That day, papers told how Brazel had reported the debris after hearing stories about "flying discs" and wondering if that was what he had picked up, then going to see Sheriff Wilcox where he "whispered kinda confidential like" that he may have found a flying disc.

Conspiracy theories

After the initial newspaper reports of 1947, the Roswell incident faded from public attention for more than 30 years, when interest re-emerged in the late 1970s. The Roswell incident was featured in films, TV shows, and books. Amid increasingly complex conspiracy theories, multiple hoaxes and legends about "alien bodies" were incorporated into the Roswell mythos. The trend culminated in 1995's purported footage of an "Alien Autopsy", which filmmakers later revealed to be a hoax (though they preferred the term "reconstruction").

Renewed interest (1978)
In February 1978, UFO researcher Stanton Friedman interviewed Jesse Marcel, who accompanied the Roswell debris from the initial debris site near Corona to the Fort Worth press conference.  Marcel's statements contradicted those he made to the press in 1947.

In November 1979, Marcel's first filmed interview was featured in a documentary titled "UFO's Are Real", co-written by Friedman. The film had a limited release but was later syndicated for broadcasting.
On February 28, 1980, sensationalist tabloid the National Enquirer brought large-scale attention to the Marcel story. On September 20, 1980, the TV series In Search of... aired an interview where Marcel described his participation in the 1947 press conference:
"They wanted some comments from me, but I wasn't at liberty to do that. So, all I could do is keep my mouth shut. And General Ramey is the one who discussed – told the newspapers, I mean the newsman, what it was, and to forget about it. It is nothing more than a weather observation balloon. Of course, we both knew differently."

Marcel gave a final interview to HBO's America Undercover which aired in August 1985.In all his statements, Marcel consistently denied the presence of bodies. Between 1978 and the early 1990s, UFO researchers such as Stanton T. Friedman, William Moore, Karl T. Pflock, and the team of Kevin D. Randle and Donald R. Schmitt interviewed several dozen people who claimed to have had a connection with the events at Roswell in 1947.

The Roswell Incident (1980)

In October 1980, Marcel's story was featured in the book The Roswell Incident by Charles Berlitz and William Moore. The authors had previously written popular books on fringe topics such as the Philadelphia Experiment and the Bermuda Triangle. 

The book argues that an extraterrestrial craft was flying over the New Mexico desert to observe nuclear weapons activity when a lightning strike killed the alien crew and, that after discovering the crash, the US government engaged in a cover-up. Historian Kathy Olmsted writes that book's narrative has come to be known as "version 1" of the Roswell myth. Berlitz and Moore's narrative was dominant until the late 1980s when other authors, attracted by the commercial potential of writing about Roswell, started producing rival accounts.

The Roswell Incident featured accounts of debris described by Marcel as "nothing made on this earth." Additional accounts by Bill Brazel, son of rancher Mac Brazel, neighbor Floyd Proctor and Walt Whitman Jr., son of newsman W. E. Whitman who had interviewed Mac Brazel, suggested the material Marcel recovered had super-strength not associated with a weather balloon.

The book introduced the contention that debris which was recovered by Marcel at the Foster ranch, visible in photographs showing Marcel posing with the debris, was substituted for debris from a weather device as part of a cover-up. The book also claimed that the debris recovered from the ranch was not permitted a close inspection by the press. The efforts by the military were described as being intended to discredit and "counteract the growing hysteria towards flying saucers". Two accounts of witness intimidation were included in the book, including the incarceration of Mac Brazel.

The authors claimed to have interviewed over 90 witnesses, though the testimony of only 25 appears in the book. Only seven of these people claimed to have seen the debris. Of these, five claimed to have handled it.

First mention of alien bodies

The Roswell Incident (1980) was the first book to introduce the controversial second-hand stories of civil engineer Grady "Barney" Barnett and a group of archaeology students from an unidentified university encountering wreckage and "alien bodies" while on the Plains of San Agustin before being escorted away by the Army. The second-hand Barnett stories, set 150 miles to the west
of Corona,  were described by ufologists as the "one aspect of the account that seemed to conflict with the basic story about the retrieval of highly unusual debris from a sheep ranch outside Corona, New Mexico, in July 1947".

Many alleged first-hand accounts of the Roswell incident actually contain information from the Aztec, New Mexico, UFO incident, a hoaxed flying saucer crash which gained national notoriety after being promoted by journalist Frank Scully in his articles and a 1950 book Behind the Flying Saucers. The hoax included stories of humanoid bodies, metals with unusual properties, and later, a nurse witnessing an autopsy.

Mortician's tale (1989)

On September 20, 1989, an episode of Unsolved Mysteries had included second-hand stories of "Barney" Barnett seeing alien bodies captured by the Army and pilot "Pappy" Henderson transporting bodies from Roswell to Texas. Mortician Glenn Dennis called the show's hotline claiming to have knowledge of the events.
Dennis claimed to have received "four or five calls" from the Air Base with questions about body preservation and inquiries about small or hermetically sealed caskets; he further claimed that a local nurse told him she had witnessed an "alien autopsy". Pflock observed that Dennis's story "sounds like a B-grade thriller conceived by Oliver Stone."
In September 1991, Dennis co-founded a UFO museum in Roswell along with former RAAF public affairs officer Walter Haut and Max Littell, a real estate salesman. Dennis appeared in multiple documentaries repeating his story.

Randle deemed Glenn Dennis one of the "least credible" Roswell witnesses. Randle said Dennis was not credible "for changing the name of the nurse once we had proved she didn't exist."
Scientific skeptic author Brian Dunning concurs that Dennis cannot be regarded as a reliable witness, considering that he had seemingly waited over 40 years before he started recounting a series of unconnected events. Such events, Dunnings argues, were then arbitrarily joined to form what has become the most popular narrative of the alleged alien crash. Some prominent UFOlogists including Karl T. Pflock, Kent Jeffrey, and William L. Moore have become convinced that there were no aliens or alien spacecraft involved in the Roswell crash.

Japanese balloons (1990)
During the final year of World War 2, Japan had launched thousands of paper and silk balloons carrying bombs designed to cause damage and spread panic in the United States.
In March 1990, UFOlogist John Keel proposed that the Roswell debris had been from a Japanese balloon bomb.  An Air Force meteorologist roundly rejected the theory, explaining a Japanese balloon "could not possibly have stayed aloft for two years".

UFO Crash at Roswell (1991)

In 1991, Kevin Randle and Donald Schmitt published UFO Crash at Roswell. They added testimony from 100 new witnesses, including those who reported an elaborate military cordon and debris recovery operation at the Foster ranch. The book included the new claims of a "gouge ... that extended four or five hundred feet [120 or 150 m]" at the ranch.

Randle and Schmitt reported Gen. Arthur Exon had been directly aware of debris and bodies, but Exon disputed his depiction, saying his comments had been based exclusively on second-hand rumors. The 1991 book sold 160,000 copies and served as the basis for the 1994 television film Roswell. Also in 1991, retired USAF Brigadier General Thomas DuBose, who had posed with debris for press photographs in 1947, publicly acknowledged the weather balloon cover story, corroborating Marcel's previous admissions.

The Barnett "alien body" accounts were mentioned in the 1991 book, though the dates and locations were changed from the accounts found in 1980's The Roswell Incident. In this new account, Brazel was described as leading the Army to a second crash site on the ranch, at which point the Army personnel were supposedly "horrified to find civilians [including Barnett] there already."

Competing accounts and schism
In 1992, Stanton Friedman released Crash at Corona, co-authored with Don Berliner. The book introduced new "witnesses" and added to the narrative by doubling the number of flying saucers to two, and the number of aliens to eight – two of which were said to have survived and been taken into custody by the government. In 1994, Randle and Schmitt authored another book, The Truth about the UFO Crash at Roswell which included a claim that alien bodies were taken by cargo plane to be viewed by Dwight D. Eisenhower. 

The existence of so many differing accounts led to a schism among ufologists about the events at Roswell. The Center for UFO Studies (CUFOS) and the Mutual UFO Network (MUFON), two leading UFO societies, disagreed in their views of the various scenarios presented by Randle–Schmitt and Friedman–Berliner; several conferences were held to try to resolve the differences. One issue under discussion was where Barnett was when he saw the alien craft he was said to have encountered. A 1992 UFO conference attempted to achieve a consensus among the various scenarios portrayed in Crash at Corona and UFO Crash at Roswell; however, the publication of The Truth About the UFO Crash at Roswell "resolved" the Barnett problem by simply ignoring Barnett and citing a new location for the alien craft recovery, including a new group of archaeologists not connected to the ones the Barnett story cited.

Air Force response (1994–1997)

After United States congressional inquiries, the General Accounting Office launched an inquiry and directed the Office of the United States Secretary of the Air Force to conduct an internal investigation. The result was summarized in two reports. The first, released in 1994, concluded that the material recovered in 1947 was likely debris from Project Mogul, a military surveillance program employing high-altitude balloons (and classified portion of an unclassified New York University project by atmospheric researchers). The second report, released in 1997, concluded that reports of recovered alien bodies were likely a combination of innocently transformed memories of accidents involving military casualties with memories of the recovery of anthropomorphic dummies in military programs such as the 1950s Operation High Dive, mixed with hoaxes perpetrated by various witnesses and UFO proponents. The psychological effects of time compression and confusion about when events occurred explained the discrepancy with the years in question.

By the 1990s, a scholarly consensus emerged concluding that the military decided to conceal the true purpose of the crashed device—nuclear test monitoring—and instead inform the public that the crash was of a weather balloon. The balloon had been launched from Alamogordo Army Air Field a month earlier. It carried a radar reflector and classified Project Mogul sensors for experimental monitoring of Soviet nuclear testing.

The Air Force reports were dismissed by UFO proponents as being either disinformation or simply implausible, though skeptical researchers such as Philip J. Klass and Robert Todd, who had been expressing doubts regarding accounts of aliens for several years, used the reports as the basis for skeptical responses to claims by UFO proponents. After the release of the Air Force reports, several books, such as Kal Korff's The Roswell UFO Crash: What They Don't Want You To Know (1997), built on the evidence presented in the reports to conclude "no credible evidence from any witness has turned out to present a compelling case that the object was extraterrestrial in origin."

Alien autopsy hoax (1995)

In 1995, film footage purporting to show an alien autopsy and claimed to have been taken by a US military official shortly after the Roswell incident was released by Ray Santilli, a London-based video entrepreneur. The footage caused an international sensation when it aired on television networks around the world. Santilli admitted in 2006 that the film was mostly a reconstruction, but continued to claim it was based on genuine footage now lost, and some original frames that had supposedly survived. A fictionalized version of the creation of the footage and its release was retold in the comedy film Alien Autopsy (2006).

The Day After Roswell (1997)
In 1997, former Lt. Col. Philip J. Corso reported in his autobiographical book The Day After Roswell that the Roswell Crash did happen and that when he was assigned to Fort Riley (Kansas) in July 1947, a Sergeant showed him purportedly-nonhuman bodies that were from an "air crash". Corso further claimed that years later, he helped oversee a project to reverse engineer recovered crash debris. Philip Klass analyzed his claims line by line and exposed many inconsistencies and factual errors. Corso's story was noted for its similarities to the film "Terminator 2: Judgment Day" which had been released six years prior; In that film, civilians secretly attempt to reverse-engineer extraordinary technology of unknown origin.

Haut document (2007)
In 2007 Donald Schmitt and Tom Carey published the book Witness to Roswell, which prominently featured a document said to be a sworn affidavit by Walter Haut, who had written the first Army press release about the Roswell crash in 1947. The document, alleged to have been left by Haut and opened only after his death in 2005, includes a description of the 1947 crash debris having been discussed by high-ranking staff and how Haut had seen alien bodies. The claims, however, drew an unimpressed response even from ufologists: Dennis Balthaser said that the document was not written by Haut, and that by 2000 Haut's mental state was such he could not recall basic details about his past, making the detail contained in the affidavit seem dubious. Physicist and skeptic Dave Thomas commented: "Is Roswell still the 'best' UFO incident? If it is, UFO proponents should be very, very worried."

On October 26, 2007, Bill Richardson (who at the time was a candidate for the Democratic Party nomination for U.S. president) was asked about releasing government files on Roswell. Richardson responded that when he was a Congressman, he attempted to get information on behalf of his New Mexico constituents, but was told by both the Department of Defense and Los Alamos Labs that the information was classified. "That ticked me off", he said, "the government doesn't tell the truth as much as it should on a lot of issues." He promised to work on opening the files if he were elected president.

Stalin-Mengele conspiracy theory (2011)

In 2011, American journalist Annie Jacobsen's Area 51: An Uncensored History of America's Top Secret Military Base featured a claim that Josef Mengele, a German SS officer and a doctor in Auschwitz, was recruited by Soviet leader Joseph Stalin to produce "grotesque, child-size aviators" to be remotely piloted and landed in America in order to cause hysteria similar to Orson Welles' The War of the Worlds (1938).

The book was criticized for extensive errors by scientists from the Federation of American Scientists. Historian Richard Rhodes, writing in The Washington Post, also criticized the book's sensationalistic reporting of "old news" and its "error-ridden" reporting. He wrote: "All of [her main source's] claims appear in one or another of the various publicly available Roswell/UFO/Area 51 books and documents churned out by believers, charlatans and scholars over the past 60 years. In attributing the stories she reports to an unnamed engineer and Manhattan Project veteran while seemingly failing to conduct even minimal research into the man’s sources, Jacobsen shows herself at a minimum extraordinarily gullible or journalistically incompetent."

Continued debunking (2017–2020)
In September 2017, UK newspaper The Guardian reported on Kodachrome slides which some had claimed showed a dead space alien. First presented at a BeWitness event in Mexico, organised by Jaime Maussan and attended by almost 7,000 people, days afterwards it was revealed that the slides were in fact of a mummified Native American child discovered in 1896 and which had been on display at the Chapin Mesa Archeological Museum in Mesa Verde, Colorado, for many decades.

In February 2020, an Air Force historian revealed a recently declassified report of a circa-1951 incident in which two Roswell personnel donned poorly fitting radioactive suits, complete with oxygen masks, while retrieving a weather balloon after an atomic test. On one occasion, they encountered a lone woman in the desert, who fainted when she saw them. The personnel could have appeared, to someone unaccustomed to then-modern gear, to be alien.

Evidence
Despite a lack of credible evidence for any alien spaceship, believers firmly hold to the belief that one did crash near Roswell but the truth has been concealed by a government conspiracy. B. D. Gildenberg has called the Roswell incident "the world's most famous, most exhaustively investigated, and most thoroughly debunked UFO claim".

Pflock said, "[T]he case for Roswell is a classic example of the triumph of quantity over quality. The advocates of the crashed-saucer tale ... simply shovel everything that seems to support their view into the box marked 'Evidence' and say, 'See? Look at all this stuff. We must be right.' Never mind the contradictions. Never mind the lack of independent supporting fact. Never mind the blatant absurdities." Korff suggests there are clear incentives for some people to promote the idea of aliens at Roswell, and that many researchers were not doing competent work: "[The] UFO field is  people who are willing to take advantage of the gullibility of others, especially the paying public. Let's not pull any punches here: The Roswell UFO myth has been very good business for UFO groups, publishers, for Hollywood, the town of Roswell, the media, and UFOlogy ... [The] number of researchers who employ science and its disciplined methodology is appallingly small."

B. D. Gildenberg wrote there were as many as 11 reported alien recovery sites and these recoveries bore only a marginal resemblance to the event as initially reported in 1947, or as recounted later by the initial witnesses. Some of these new accounts could have been confused accounts of the several known recoveries of injured and dead servicemen from four military plane crashes that occurred in the area from 1948 to 1950. Other accounts could have been based on memories of recoveries of test dummies, as suggested by the Air Force in their reports. Charles Ziegler argued that the Roswell story has all the hallmarks of a traditional folk narrative. He identified six distinct narratives, and a process of transmission via storytellers with a core story that was created from various witness accounts and was then shaped and molded by those who carry on the UFO community's tradition. Other "witnesses" were then sought out to expand the core narrative, with those giving accounts not in line with the core beliefs being repudiated or simply omitted by the "gatekeepers". Others then retold the narrative in its new form. This whole process would repeat over time.

Problems with witness accounts
Though hundreds of people were interviewed by various researchers, only a few of these people claimed to have seen debris or aliens. Most witnesses were just repeating the claims of others. Pflock notes that of these 300-plus individuals reportedly interviewed for UFO Crash at Roswell (1991), only 41 can be "considered genuine first- or second-hand witnesses" and only 23 can be "reasonably thought to have seen physical evidence, debris". Of these, only seven have asserted anything suggestive of otherworldly origins for the debris.

In The Roswell Incident, Marcel stated, "Actually, this material may have looked like tinfoil and balsa wood, but the resemblance ended there ... They took one picture of me on the floor holding up some of the less-interesting metallic debris ... The stuff in that one photo was pieces of the actual stuff we found. It was not a staged photo." Timothy Printy points out that the material Marcel positively identified as being part of what he recovered is material that skeptics and UFO advocates agree is debris from a balloon device. After that fact was pointed out to him, Marcel changed his story to say that that material was not what he recovered. Skeptics like Robert Todd argued that Marcel had a history of embellishment and exaggeration, such as claiming to have been a pilot and having received five Air Medals for shooting down enemy planes, claims that were all found to be false, and skeptics feel that his evolving Roswell story was simply another instance of this tendency to fabricate.

Problems with alien body witnesses
As for the accounts from those who claimed to have seen aliens, critics identified problems ranging from the reliability of second-hand accounts to credibility problems with witnesses making demonstrably false claims, or multiple, contradictory accounts, to dubious death-bed confessions or accounts from elderly and easily confused witnesses. Pflock noted that only four people with supposed firsthand knowledge of alien bodies were interviewed by Roswell authors. All reports of bodies came about a minimum of 31 years after the fact.

Greys and False Memory Syndrome

In popular lore, "grays are said to be the creatures whose flying saucer crashed near Roswell in 1947. Various claims have the grays' bodies found among the wreckage while others assert that some survived". However, no mention of alien bodies related to the Roswell incident occurs until 1980.

In the interval between 1947 and 1980, the idea of Grey aliens had entered the public consciousness beginning with the Betty and Barney Hill incident. In December 1963, Betty Hill and her husband Barney sought out a psychiatrist after Betty experienced recurring nightmares. On February 10, 1964, the ABC Network broadcast an episode of the science fiction television show The Outer Limits that featured an extraterrestrial with large, wrap-around eyes. Twelve days later, during a hypnosis session, Barney Hill told his psychiatrist a story about a being with wrap-around eyes. Modern psychiatric consensus is that Hill experienced false memory syndrome, in which therapy methods such as hypnosis lead to confabulations.

On October 20, 1975, the NBC network aired a made-for-TV movie inspired by the Hills starring James Earl Jones. Depictions of Grey aliens would go on to appear in a number of books, films, and television shows, such as the 1977 film Close Encounters of the Third Kind. Greys would later be incorporated into the Roswell legend.

Presidential comments
In a 2012 visit to Roswell, President Barack Obama joked "I come in peace." In December 2020, Obama joked with Stephen Colbert: "It used to be that UFOs and Roswell was the biggest conspiracy. And now that seems so tame, the idea that the government might have an alien spaceship."

In a 2014 interview, former President Bill Clinton reported that his administration had investigated the incident, saying "When the Roswell thing came up, I knew we’d get gazillions of letters. So I had all the Roswell papers reviewed, everything".

When asked during a 2015 interview with GQ magazine about whether he had looked at top-secret classified information, Obama replied, "I gotta tell you, it's a little disappointing. People always ask me about Roswell and the aliens and UFOs, and it turns out the stuff going on that's top secret isn't nearly as exciting as you expect. In this day and age, it's not as top secret as you'd think."

In June 2020, then-President Donald Trump, when asked if he would consider releasing more information about the Roswell incident, said "I won’t talk to you about what I know about it, but it’s very interesting."

Roswell as myth

Scholars of folklore have charted the evolution of the Roswell myth over the course of decades, beginning with the final year of the Second World War (1944-5), when Japan released thousands of Fu-Go balloon bombs designed to cause damage and spread panic in the United States.  In  1947, the  top secret Project Mogul began releasing nuclear-test surveillance balloons inspired by the Japanese balloons.
     
On June 24, 1947,  civilian pilot Kenneth Arnold's report of 'flying discs' triggered hundreds of copycat reports during the 1947 flying disc craze.  During the craze, on July 8, the US Army reported the recovery of a 'flying disc' near Roswell;  The following day, the Army publicly identified the debris as an ordinary weather balloon. 

Days later, on July 11, press reported on a hoaxed disc that was recovered in Twin Falls.  In 1949, con-artists tricked the magazine Variety into publishing the story of a crashed saucer with dead alien bodies near Aztec, New Mexico.  The Aztec hoax's story of dead alien bodies was later incorporated into the Roswell mythology. 

Decades later, in 1978, retired Army Major Jesse Marcel reported that the Roswell "weather balloon" was a cover story.   Two years later, the book Roswell Incident (1980) popularized Marcel's tale, incorporating the story of alien bodies on the Plains of San Agustin.   In 1981, tabloid The Globe told stories of bodies being brought to Roswell. In 1989, in response to an Unsolved Mysteries episode discussing the story of Roswell bodies,  mortician Glenn Dennis recounted a tale of a nurse who had assisted in an alien autopsy. 

In 1991, retired Brigadier General Thomas DuBose corroborated Marcel's claims that the weather balloon was cover story, while both men consistently denied the existence of bodies.  Mystery about the Roswell debris ended in 1994 and 1997, when the US Air Force Roswell Reports identified the material as part of a top secret atomic surveillance balloon from Project Mogul launched on June 4 which had last been tracked near Corona.

According to anthropologists Susan Harding and Kathleen Stewart, the Roswell Story was a prime example of how a discourse moved from the fringes to the mainstream according to the prevailing zeitgeist: public preoccupation in the 1980s with "conspiracy, cover-up and repression" aligned well with the Roswell narratives as told in the "sensational books" which were being published. Additionally, skeptics and some social anthropologists saw the increasingly elaborate accounts of alien crash landings and government cover-ups as evidence of a myth being constructed.

Prominent skeptics Joe Nickell and co-author James McGaha identified a myth-making process, which they called the "Roswellian syndrome". In this syndrome, a myth is proposed to have five distinct stages of development: incident, debunking, submergence, mythologizing, and reemergence and media bandwagon effect. The authors predicted that the Roswellian syndrome would "play out again and again", in other UFO and conspiracy-theory stories.

In popular fiction
 In the 1980 film Hangar 18, an alien ship crashes in the desert of the US Southwest. Debris and bodies are recovered, but their existence is covered up by the government. Filmmaker James L. Conway summarized the film as "a modern-day dramatization of the Roswell incident". 
 The 1993–2002 TV series The X-Files included the Roswell Incident as a recurring motif, most prominently in "My Struggle". The 1996 episode "Jose Chung's From Outer Space" satirized the Santelli Alien Autopsy film.
 In the 1995 Star Trek: Deep Space Nine episode "Little Green Men", protagonists from the 24th century travel back in time and cause the Roswell incident.
 In the 1996 film Independence Day, an alien invasion prompts the revelation of a Roswell crash and cover-up extending even to concealing the information from the President of the United States, to facilitate plausible deniability, according to the Defense Secretary.
 The 1996–97 series Dark Skies featured a shadowy conspiracy to cover up the Roswell Incident. The show's tagline was "History as we know it is a lie."
 The 1996 comic series Roswell, Little Green Man was inspired by the story of the Roswell Incident.
 The 1998–2001 TV series Seven Days features time-travel technology developed after a crash at Roswell.
 The 1999 made-for-TV movie Roswell: The Aliens Attack features survivors of Roswell bent on destroying the Earth.
 The 1999–2002 TV series Roswell aired based on the Roswell High series of books.
 The 2019 TV series Roswell, New Mexico is the second adaptation of the Roswell High books.
 In the 2001 Futurama episode "Roswell That Ends Well", protagonists from the 31st century travel back in time and cause the Roswell incident.
 The 2002 miniseries Taken depicts the aftermath of the Roswell Incident.
 The 2006 comedy Alien Autopsy revolves around the 1990s-creation of the Santilli film.
 The 2006–08 online graphic novel Roswell, Texas references the Roswell Incident.
 The 2008 film Indiana Jones and the Kingdom of the Crystal Skull sees the protagonist on a quest for an alien body from the Roswell Incident.
 The 2011 film Paul tells the story of Roswell tourists who rescue a grey alien.

See also
 Aztec, New Mexico UFO hoax
 Twin Falls Saucer Hoax
 Kecksburg UFO incident
 List of conspiracy theories
 List of reported UFO sightings
 Nazi UFOs
 UFO conspiracy theory
 Storm Area 51

References

Notes

Sources

Further reading

Books, articles
 
 
 

 
1947 in military history
1947 in New Mexico
July 1947 events in the United States
Aviation accidents and incidents in the United States in 1947
Conspiracy theories by subject
Conspiracy theories in the United States
Hoaxes in the United States
1947 flying disc craze